Elafibranor (INN, code name GFT505) is an experimental medication that is being studied and developed by Genfit for the treatment of cardiometabolic diseases including diabetes, insulin resistance, dyslipidemia, and non-alcoholic fatty liver disease  (NAFLD).

Elafibranor is a dual PPARα/δ agonist.

See also 
 MBX-8025
 Resveratrol
 Telmisartan

References

External links 
 Genfit Pharmaceutical
 NashBiotechs  Several articles on drug candidates in NASH

PPAR agonists
Experimental drugs
Orphan drugs